Sambhaji Patil Nilangekar (born 20 June 1977) is an Indian politician and leader of a Bharatiya Janata Party (BJP) from Maharashtra currently representing  Nilanga constituency, Maharashtra as Member of Maharashtra Legislative Assembly.

He had represented Nilanga (VidhanSabha constituency) in 2004, 2014 and 2019. Sambhajirao Patil Nilangekar served as Cabinet Minister for Maharashtra State Government. He was also guardian minister of Latur District.

Public Leadership
Sambhajirao Patil Nilangekar is the leader of the Bharatiya Janata Party in Latur district. On entering politics at a very young age, he became  the youngest MLA in Marathwada (27 years old) when he won  Nilanga vidhansabha  constituency in 2004. 

He was instrumental in steering and nurturing the Bharatiya Janata Party in Latur district and played a key role in the Bharatiya Janata Party's victory in the 2017 Latur Municipal Corporation elections. In 2020, the Bharatiya Janata Party secured victory over 7 out of 10 Panchayat Samitis and elected the Zilla Parishad President and Vice President unopposed.

Railway bogie factory : Transforming Marathwada
The problem of unemployment is becoming serious in Marathwada. That is why he followed up with the then Railway Minister Piyush Goyal and Chief Minister Devendraji Fadnavis and got the Railway Bogie factory approved. Being largest factory of the Central Government in Marathwada, this will be of great help in developing the industrial sector in Marathwada. The factory will also manufacture air-conditioned bogies for the metro which will provide employment to thousands of young people. The foundation ceremony was held on 31 March 2018 by the then  Chief Minister Devendra Fadnavis, and Railway Minister Piyush Goyal. The 150.54 hectare project of railway bogie factory started on 12 October. The first phase railway bogie factory aims to produce 250 bogies a year, while the second phase aims to build 400 bogies a year.

 The first coach shell is completed on the target date, i.e. , 25 December 2020.

References

External links
  http://epaperlokmat.in/Archive/epapernew.php?articleid=LOK_HLTR_20191025_2_1&arted=Hello%20Latur&width=597px
  http://epaperlokmat.in/Archive/epapernew.php?articleid=LOK_HLTR_20191028_4_7&arted=Hello%20Latur&width=216px
  http://epaperlokmat.in/Archive/epapernew.php?articleid=LOK_HLTR_20191103_1_5&arted=Hello%20Latur&width=222px
  http://epaper.esakal.com/FlashClient/Client_Panel.aspx#currPage=3
  http://epaper.lokmat.com/articlepage.php?articleid=LOK_HLTR_20201211_1_10
  http://epaper.lokmat.com/articlepage.php?articleid=LOK_HLTR_20201211_1_9
  http://epaper.lokmat.com/articlepage.php?articleid=LOK_HLTR_20201211_4_15
  http://epaper.lokmat.com/articlepage.php?articleid=LOK_HLTR_20201211_4_14

Living people
Maharashtra MLAs 2004–2009
1978 births
Savitribai Phule Pune University alumni
Maharashtra MLAs 2014–2019
People from Latur district
Marathi politicians
Bharatiya Janata Party politicians from Maharashtra